Ryan James Gruhn (born July 22, 1982) is an American Martial Artist, MMA Coach, and Brazilian Jiu-Jitsu Black Belt.

Personal life 
Gruhn was born in State College, Pennsylvania and attended State College Area High School. He went to Penn State University where he studied business.

Martial arts

History 
Gruhn began his martial arts training at the age of six in Tae Kwan Do and started studying the Striking Arts (Muay Thai & Boxing), Grappling Arts (Submission Wrestling & Brazilian Jiu-Jitsu) and Weapons Arts (Kali/Escrima/Silat/Arnis) at the age of twelve with Dan Inosanto, Erik Paulson and Surachai Sirisute. Ryan is best known for his fighting in Dog Brothers Gatherings. He has fought both nationally and internationally  in Real Contact Stick Fighting events since 2005.

Gruhn is a Brazilian Jiu-Jitsu Black Belt under MMA pioneer and fifth Degree Black Belt; Erik Paulson. Other notable instructors of Ryan's include Surachai Sirisute (Muay Thai) and Marc Denny "Crafty Dog" (Dog Brothers Martial Arts / Filipino Martial Arts).

Gruhn is the only person to simultaneously hold the title of “Ajarn” in Muay Thai (Black Arm Band), “Guro” in Dog Brothers Martial Arts (Black Dog Tag) and "Professor" in Brazilian Jiu-Jitsu (Black Belt). He was also the first ever to earn the rank of "Black Dog Tag" in Dog Brothers Martial Arts.

Dog Brothers 
Gruhn is part of the Dog Brothers who put on semi-annual Real Contact Stick Fighting events in Los Angeles, California, Canada and Europe. He has been part of several documentaries including "Dog Brothers Reality Show" by Discovery Channel, "Fight Club, No Limits" by National Geographic Channel and "Dog Brothers Cruel Combat" InDemand  which aired on the Comcast Network.

Ryan is considered a "Full Dog Brother" which he earned by fighting in the Dog Brothers Gatherings in both Toronto, Canada and Los Angeles, California. He earned the name of "Guard Dog" on February 27, 2012 at the First Annual Canadian Gathering held in Toronto, Canada.

Coaching 

Gruhn coached professional fighters; Phil Davis (UFC/Bellator), Ed Ruth  (Bellator), Patrick Cummins  (UFC), Paul Bradley  (WSOF) and Jimy Hettes (UFC) when they trained in State College, PA at the defunct Lion Heart Fighters gym and at current Central PA Mixed Martial Arts. Gruhn's students have won titles in Muay Thai, MMA and Golden Gloves Boxing along with fighting in Real Contact Stick Fighting and Brazilian Jiu-Jitsu. Gruhn coached Phil Davis and Ed Ruth while training at Central PA Mixed Martial Arts ahead of Bellator 186 on November 4 at the Bryce Jordan Center.

Stick fighting events

Grappling record

Lineages 
Brazilian Jiu-Jitsu
 Kano Jigoro → Tomita Tsunejirō & Mitsuyo Maeda → Carlos Gracie Sr. & Hélio Gracie → Rolls Gracie & Carlos "Carlinhos" Gracie Jr → Rigan Machado & Erik Paulson
Dog Brothers Martial Arts
 Dan Inosanto → Marc Denny
Jeet Kune Do/Filipino Martial Arts
 Bruce Lee → Dan Inosanto
Muay Thai
 Chai Sirisute

Television, podcasts and DVDs 

 The Shin Guard System
 "Dog Brothers Reality Show" Discovery Channel
 "Fight Club, No Limits" National Geographic Channel
 "Dog Brothers Cruel Combat" InDemand  on the Comcast Network.
 "Die Less Often 1" Dog Brothers
 "A Gathering of the Pack 2"

News 
On October 21, 2017, Gruhn competed and won the silver medal in the Kasai Elite Grappling Championships.  While he originally went to coach his Jiu-Jitsu team from Central PA Mixed Martial Arts, one of his students was left without a match.  Instead of leaving her without a match, Gruhn stepped up and competed against her, earning a silver medal in the Ultra heavy Black Belt division.  This made headlines as his student was a female white belt who he lost to.

On November 2, 2017, Central PA Mixed Martial Arts hosted ADCC Champion Gordon Ryan for a seminar.  Gordon Ryan accused Gruhn of filming him with his cell phone.

On March 2, 2019, Gruhn won Gold at North American Grappling Association in Albany, NY at the expert/Black Belt level.

On March 4, 2019, Gruhn was featured in Town & Gown Magazine.

References 

1982 births
Living people
American martial artists
People from State College, Pennsylvania
Smeal College of Business alumni